English indie rock band Bombay Bicycle Club have released five studio albums, three extended plays and eighteen singles. Their debut studio album, I Had the Blues But I Shook Them Loose, was released in July 2009 and peaked at number forty-six on the UK Albums Chart. Their second studio album, Flaws, was released in July 2010 and peaked at number eight on the UK Albums Chart. Their third studio album, A Different Kind of Fix, was released in August 2011 and peaked at number six on the UK Albums Chart. Their fourth studio album, So Long, See You Tomorrow, was released in February 2014 and peaked at number one on the UK Albums Chart.

Albums

Studio albums

Live albums

Compilation albums

Extended plays

Singles

As lead artist

Promotional singles

Other charted songs

Notes

References

Discographies of British artists